Sophia Elizabeth Gennusa (born October 20, 2003) is an American actress most known for playing the titular role of Matilda Wormwood, in the original Broadway cast of Matilda the Musical, and Hannah Shepherd in The Enemy Within.

Career
Gennusa is best known for debuting the role of Matilda Wormwood in the Broadway production of Matilda alongside Bailey Ryon, Oona Laurence, and Milly Shapiro at the Shubert Theatre. She returned to Broadway in 2015 for the new musical Doctor Zhivago at the Broadway Theatre. It closed after about three weeks, with an additional month of previews.

Gennusa frequently performs in benefit concerts and cabarets, and as of 2016 is the singer of the theme song for Sesame Street. She sang on an episode of Last Week Tonight with John Oliver in 2015.

In 2019, Gennusa began a recurring role on The Enemy Within as Hannah Shepherd.

Personal life
Gennusa lives in Westchester County with her parents.

Awards
She performed in Matilda as Matilda Wormwood until December 21, 2013. She later won a Tony Honor with Oona Laurence, Milly Shapiro, and Bailey Ryon for their outstanding Broadway debut in the show. She was also nominated for a Grammy Award for the cast album of Matilda.

Filmography

Television

Theatre

Singles

Dance

References

American child actresses
American musical theatre actresses
Living people
2003 births
21st-century American actresses
People from Westchester County, New York
Actresses from New York (state)